In finance, the quick ratio, also known as the acid-test ratio is a type of liquidity ratio, which measures the ability of a company to use its near cash or quick assets to extinguish or retire its current liabilities immediately. It is defined as the ratio between quickly available or liquid assets and current liabilities. Quick assets are current assets that can presumably be quickly converted to cash at close to their book values. 

A normal liquid ratio is considered to be 1:1. A company with a quick ratio of less than 1 cannot currently fully pay back its current liabilities. 

The quick ratio is similar to the current ratio but provides a more conservative assessment of the liquidity position of firms as it excludes inventory, which it does not consider as sufficiently liquid.

Formula

or specifically:

It can also be expressed as: Ratio

Ratios are tests of viability for business entities but do not give a complete picture of the business's health. If a business has large amounts in accounts receivable which are due for payment after a long period (say 120 days), and essential business expenses and accounts payable due for immediate payment, the quick ratio may look healthy when the business is actually about to run out of cash. In contrast, if the business has negotiated fast payment or cash from customers, and long terms from suppliers, it may have a very low quick ratio and yet be very healthy.

More detailed analysis of all major payables and receivables in line with market sentiments and adjusting input data accordingly shall give more sensible outcomes which shall give actionable insights.

Generally, the acid test ratio should be 1:1 or higher; however, this varies widely by industry. In general, the higher the ratio, the greater the company's liquidity (i.e., the better able to meet current obligations using liquid assets).

See also
Current ratio
Financial Accounting

References 

Financial ratios